Rafael Lozano-Hemmer  (born 1967 in Mexico City) is a Mexican-Canadian electronic artist who works with ideas from architecture, technological theater and performance. Lozano-Hemmer lives and works in Montreal and Madrid.

Biography

Rafael Lozano-Hemmer was born in Mexico City in 1967. He emigrated to Canada in 1985 to study at the University of Victoria in British Columbia and then received his Bachelor of Science in physical chemistry from Concordia University in Montreal. The son of Mexico City nightclub owners, Lozano-Hemmer was drawn to science but could not resist joining the creative activities of his friends. Initially he worked in a molecular recognition lab in Montreal and published his research in Chemistry journals. Though he did not pursue the sciences as a direct career, it has influenced his work in many ways, providing conceptual inspiration and practical approaches to create his work. Lozano-Hemmer's work can be considered a blend of interactive art and performance art, using both large and small scales, indoor and outdoor settings, and a wide variety of audiovisual technologies.

Lozano-Hemmer is best known for creating and presenting theatrical interactive installations in public spaces across Europe, Asia and America. Using robotics, real-time computer graphics, film projections, positional sound, internet links, cell phone interfaces, video and ultrasonic sensors, LED screens and other devices, his installations seek to interrupt the increasingly homogenized urban condition by providing critical platforms for participation. Lozano-Hemmer's smaller-scaled sculptural and video installations explore themes of perception, deception and surveillance. As an outgrowth of these various large scale and performance-based projects Lozano-Hemmer documents the works in photography editions that are also exhibited.

In 1999, he created Alzado Vectorial (or Vectorial Elevation), where internet participants directed searchlights over the central square in Mexico City. The work was repeated in Vitoria-Gasteiz in 2002, in Lyon in 2003, in Dublin in 2004 and in Vancouver in 2010. In 2007, he became the first artist to officially represent Mexico at the Venice Biennale, with a solo show at the Palazzo Soranzo Van Axel. In 2006, his work 33 Questions Per Minute was acquired by The Museum of Modern Art in New York. Subtitled Public (2005) is held in the Tate Collection in the United Kingdom. In 2014/2015 his work was presented in the Solo Exhibition A Draft of Shadows at Bildmuseet, Umeå University, Sweden.

Artworks

Text art
Several of Lozano-Hemmer's installations include the use of words and sentences to add additional meaning. These texts are used to elaborate upon a deeper meaning that involves a viewer's actions, to change or create an effect upon the atmosphere and perception. Some of the text based installations, such as Third Person and Subtitled Public, place words upon the viewer himself. Because of the random nature of these texts, the viewer has no control over what they are labeled as, incurring a sense of helplessness, and experience the pleasant and unpleasant connotations that are associated with the words placed upon themselves. The text based installations such as 33 Questions Per Minute and There is No Business Like No Business are reliant upon the willing participation of the viewer. These two forms of text installations are externally reflective, while the first two are internally reflective.

33 Questions Per Minute is an installation consisting of several screens programmed to generate possible questions and display them at a rate of 33 per minute. The computer generating the questions can generate 55 billion unique questions, taking over 3,000 years to display them all. In addition to viewing the automatically displaying the questions, members of the public can submit their own questions into the system. Their participation shows up on the screens immediately, and is registered by the program.

Third Person is the second piece of the ShadowBox series of interactive displays with a built-in computerized tracking system. This piece shows the viewer's shadow, composed hundreds of tiny words that are in fact all the verbs of the dictionary conjugated in the third person. The portrait of the viewer is drawn in real time by active words, which appear automatically to fill his or her silhouette.

There Is No Business Like No Business is a blinking neon sign, whose speed is directly proportional to the number of times that the word "economy" has appeared in online news items within the past 24 hours.

Subtitled Public consists of an empty exhibition space where visitors are detected by a computerized surveillance system. When people enter the space, the system generates a subtitle for each person and projects it onto him or her: the subtitle is chosen at random from a list of all verbs conjugated in the third person. The only way of getting rid of a subtitle is to touch another person, which leads to the two subtitles being exchanged. His work gave to the public a free entertainment, and  he also help them to have a marvelous experience.[15]non-primary source needed

Relational architecture
In 1994, Lozano-Hemmer coined the term "relational architecture" as the technological actualization of buildings and the urban environment with alien memory. He aimed to transform the dominant narratives of a specific building or urban setting by superimposing audiovisual elements to affect it, effect it and re-contextualize it. From 1997 to 2006, he built ten works of relational architecture beginning with Displaced Emperors and ending with Under Scan. Lozano-Hemmer says, "I want buildings to pretend to be something other than themselves, to engage in a kind of dissimulation"

Solar Equation was a large-scale public art installation that consists of a faithful simulation of the Sun, scaled 100 million times smaller than the real thing. Commissioned by the Light in Winter Festival in Melbourne, Australia, the piece featured the world's largest spherical balloon, custom-manufactured for the project, which was tethered over Federation Square and animated using five projectors. The solar animation on the balloon was generated by live mathematical equations that simulated the turbulence, flares and sunspots that can be seen on the surface of the Sun. This produced a constantly changing display that never repeated itself, giving viewers a glimpse of the majestic phenomena that are observable at the solar surface and that only relatively recent advances in astronomy have discovered.

Under Scan is an interactive video art installation for public space. In the work, passers-by are detected by a computerized tracking system, which activates video-portraits projected within their shadow. Over one thousand video-portraits of volunteers were taken in Derby, Leicester, Lincoln, Northampton and Nottingham (in England) by a team of local filmmakers. For a London presentation in Trafalgar Square, Tate Modern filmed over 250 additional recordings. As people were free to portray themselves in whatever way they desired, a wide range of performances were captured. In the installation, the portraits appeared at random locations. They "wake-up" and establish eye contact with a viewer as soon as his or her shadow "reveals" them. As the viewer walks away, the portrait reacts by looking away, and eventually disappears if no one activates it.

Thousands of photographic portraits, previously taken on the streets of the host city, are shown using robotically controlled projectors. However, the portraits only appear inside the projected shadows of the passers-by, whose silhouettes can measure , depending on how close or far away they are from the powerful light sources positioned on the ground. A video surveillance tracking system triggers new portraits when all the existing ones have been revealed, inviting the public to occupy new narratives of representation. Lozano-Hemmer comments, "my initial desire was to use artificial shadows to generate questions about embodiment and disembodiment, about spectacular representation, about the distance between bodies in public space, and so on".

Re:Positioning Fear was the third relational architecture project. This was a large-scale installation on the Landeszeughaus military arsenal, with the projection only being seen in the shadows of passers-by. Using tracking systems, the shadows were automatically focused and generated sounds. A real-time discussion about the transformation of the concept of "fear" was projected inside the shadows; the chat involved 30 artists and theorists from 17 countries.

Sculpture
Tape Recorders is an installation containing rows of motorized measuring tapes recording the amount of time that visitors stay in the installation. As a computerized tracking system detects the presence of a person, the closest measuring tape starts to project upwards.

Please Empty your Pockets is an installation that consists of a conveyor belt with a computerized scanner that records and stores images of  everything that passes under it. The viewer may place any small item on the conveyor belt, for example keys, ID cards, wallets, worry beads, condoms, notepads, cellphones, coins, dolls, credit cards, etc. Once they pass under the scanner, the objects reappear on the other side of the conveyor belt beside projected objects from the stored images of the installation. As a real item is removed from the conveyor belt, it leaves behind a projected image of itself, which is then used to accompany future objects.

Microphones is an interactive installation featuring one or several 1939-vintage Shure microphones, placed on mike stands around the exhibition room at different heights. Each microphone has been modified so that inside its head is a tiny loudspeaker and a circuit board connected to a network of hidden control computers. When a public member speaks into a microphone, it records his or her voice, then immediately plays back the voice of a previous participant, as an echo from the past.

Standards and Double Standards is an interactive installation that consists of 10 to 100 fastened belts that are suspended at waist height from stepper motors on the ceiling of the exhibition room. Controlled by a computerized tracking system, the belts rotate automatically to follow the public, turning their buckles slowly to face passers-by. When several people are in the room, their presence affects the entire group of belts, creating chaotic patterns of interference. Non-linear behaviours emerge such as turbulence, eddies, and relatively quiet regions. One of the aims of this piece is to visualize complex dynamics, turning a condition of pure surveillance into an unpredictable connective system. The piece creates an "absent crowd" using a fetish of paternal authority: the belt.

Less than three is an installation consisting of a series of light beams that form a kind of network between two analogue intercoms. When a viewer speaks into one of the intercoms, he can see how the voice signal is converted into flashes of light that are visibly transmitted along one of the several possible routes through the network. When the flash of light reaches the other end, the spoken phrase is released and transformed again, from light to sound. The installation interacts by transforming sound stimuli into light, which is then turned back into sound again. It was shown at Disseny Hub Barcelona between 2011 and 2012 at the exhibit I/O/I. The senses of machines (Interaction Laboratory)

Voice Array is a participatory installation featuring up to 288 anonymous vocal samples—played in uneven unison, and accompanied by pulses of vibrant white light in discrete beams, emanating from above and below a raised black strip along a back wall. When activated, the piece connotes the pulsing volume bars on an old stereo, turning sound into light to measure intensity. Any visitor can speak into the silver-buttoned intercom to the left of the strip—upon withdrawal, the recording immediately transforms into a flashing sequence, stored as a loop in the first light of the array.

Entanglement is an installation that consists of two neon signs that say “entanglement” on them that light up. The two signs are 72 inches by 14.75 inches in size. The two signs both have a light switch that turns both of them on and off. When one of the light switches is turned on, both signs light up. When one of the light switches is turned off, both signs are off. The two signs are placed in separate rooms, separate buildings, or even in separate countries. The idea came from what entanglement means in quantum physics which is where two particles behave as one.

Bifurcation is an installation where a “Y” shaped branch dangles in the air that is attached to the ceiling by a piece of string. Behind the branch is a projection of a whole branch, showing what the “Y” shaped branch once looked like. As the “Y” shaped branch moves with the air movement or by people moving it, the projection also moves in synchronization with the dangling branch. This is Rafael Lozano-Hemmer's second piece in “Shadow Objects.” The piece was inspired by Octavio Paz and Bioy Casares who stated that “absence and presence are not opposites.”

Pan Anthem (2014) is an interactive installation of hundreds of movable speakers that play national anthems when the viewer approaches. These speakers are arranged throughout the gallery's walls based on national statistics. For example, the arrangement may depend on population, year of independence, etc.

Speaking Willow, is an interactive, motion-detecting tree that will whisper to visitors in hundreds of different languages at Washington, D.C.'s   Planet Word Museum.  Anticipated installation date 2020.

Other works
In 2013 Lozano-Hemmer created a piece called Friendfracker. This was an online service that Lozano-Hemmer created along with Harper-Reed in one day. A participant would enter their Facebook account information into the online program, then once the information was verified the service would delete up to 10 of the participant's friends on their Facebook account. The service wouldn't tell which friends were deleted. Facebook disabled the program on April 25, 2013.

The Pulse Room is an interactive installation featuring over 300 hundred clear incandescent light bulbs, 300 W each, hung by cables three metres from the floor. It has run in many places in the last years such as Venice, Italy; and Aarhus, Denmark.

Technology
Lozano-Hemmer differs from many artists in his comprehensive use of technology; most of his productions contain more than one element of technology to create a lasting effect. Lozano-Hemmer recognizes that Western culture is a technology-based culture, emphasizing "even if you are not using a computer you are affected by this environment. Working with technology is inevitable." "Our politics, our culture, our economy, everything is running through globalized networks of communication..."

Technologies that Lozano-Hemmer has used in his works include robotics, custom software, projections, internet links, cell phones, sensors, LEDs, cameras, and tracking systems.

Solo exhibitions
 A Draft of Shadows Bildmuseet, Umeå University, Sweden. November 2, 2014 - April 26, 2015

Awards

 Governor General's Awards in Visual and Media Arts, Ottawa, Canada 2015.
 Interactive Art Honorable Mention, Ars Electronica 2013, Linz, Austria 2013.
 Joyce Award, The Joyce Foundation, Chicago, Illinois, United States 2012.
 BAFTA British Academy Award for Interactive Art 2005, London, United Kingdom 2005.
 Artist/Performer of the year, Wired Magazine Rave Awards, San Francisco, California, United States 2003.
 Rockefeller-Ford Fellowship, New York City, New York, United States 2003.
 Trophée des Lumiéres, Lyon, France 2003.
 World Technology Network Award for the Arts, San Francisco, California, United States 2003.
 BAFTA British Academy Award for Interactive Art 2002, London, United Kingdom 2002.
 Gold Award, Interactive Media Design Review 2002, I.D. Magazine, United States 2002.
 Interactive Art Distinction, Ars Electronica 2002, Linz, Austria 2002.
 International Bauhaus Award 2002, 1st Prize, Dessau, Germany 2002.
 Distinction, SFMOMA Webby Awards 2000, San Francisco, California, United States 2000.
 Excellence Award, Media Arts Festival 2000, CG Arts, Tokyo, Japan 2000.
 Finalist, Medienkunstpreis 2000, ZKM, Karlsruhe, Germany 2000.
 Interactive Art Golden Nica, Ars Electronica 2000, Linz, Austria 2000.
 Interactive Art Honorable Mention, Ars Electronica 1998, Linz, Austria 1998.
 Best Installation, Interactive Digital Media Awards 1996, Toronto, Ontario, Canada 1996.
 2nd Prize, Cyberstar, Köln, Germany, June 1995.
 Interactive Art Honorable Mention, Ars Electronica 1995, Linz, Austria 1995.

Further reading
Maciej Ożóg, "Surveilling the Surveillance Society: The Case of Rafael Lozano-Hemmer's Installations" in Outi Remes and Pam Skelton (eds.), Conspiracy Dwellings: Surveillance in Contemporary Art. Cambridge Scholars Publishing, 2010. Info at: https://web.archive.org/web/20110609232602/http://www.c-s-p.org/flyers/Conspiracy-Dwellings--Surveillance-in-Contemporary-Art1-4438-1905-0.htm

References

External links

Official website
Art 21 interview

1967 births
Living people
 
Concordia University alumni
Canadian contemporary artists
Mexican contemporary artists
Mexican emigrants to Canada
New media artists
Artists from Madrid 
Artists from Mexico City
Artists from Montreal
Canadian installation artists
Canadian physical chemists
Mexican physical chemists
Governor General's Award in Visual and Media Arts winners
Members of the Royal Canadian Academy of Arts